Deportation of Afghan immigrants from the United States typically refers to the forced repatriation of Afghans who are convicted of crimes in the United States and are not American citizens.

History 

The earliest Afghan immigrant in deportation proceedings has been reported in 1945. The immigration officials suspended (cancelled) his deportation, which allowed him to remain in the United States with his American family. Another Afghan immigrant was placed in deportation proceedings in the early 1950s.

Afghans escaping from totalitarianism and genocide

Afghanistan began to experience a great turmoil in the 1970s, which resulted in a mass exodus of its citizens. These people were first admitted to neighboring Pakistan and Iran as refugees escaping from: (1) totalitarianism and genocide orchestrated by the communist People's Democratic Party of Afghanistan (PDPA); and (2) political repression of the mujahideen, who were engaged in a guerrilla warfare with the PDPA. Pakistan and Iran do not provide citizenship or permanent residency to Afghan refugees. In 1980, Congress and the Carter administration enacted the Refugee Act, which approved 50,000 international refugees to be firmly resettled in the United States each year.

Resettlement of Afghan immigrants in the United States

Each year (from 1980 onward) groups of Afghan refugee families lawfully entered the United States.F These families were issued by the U.S. Department of State special travel documents. At least one such family entered with fraudulent documents and applied for asylum in the United States. These immigrant families were firmly resettled all across the United States but mainly in and around New York City followed by in California, Virginia, Texas, Georgia, Pennsylvania, Florida and elsewhere.

Reasons for forceful deportation from the United States to Afghanistan

About Afghan-Americans, Cato Institute stated:

Although Afghanistan and the United States have no repatriation agreement, approximately 378 people from the United States have been expelled, returned or extradited to Afghanistan between November 2002 and January 2016. At least 225 had no criminal conviction.

According to Fox News, "ICE deported more than 200 people from the U.S. to Afghanistan" in the last decade. These people were Afghan refugees and asylum seekers, including Afghan-Americans who have been convicted of a common crime in the United States. Some may have been wrongfully deported. "Recent data suggests that in 2010 well over 4,000 U.S. citizens were detained or deported as aliens[.]"

See also 
 List of human rights organisations
 Non-refoulement
 United Nations High Commissioner for Refugees (UNHCR)

References 
This article in most part is based on law of the United States, including statutory and published case law.

External links
 Lawyer: Afghan who helped US military fears deportation (Fox News, Sept. 26, 2017)
 Afghan who served US military detained by ICE (Creede Newton, Al Jazeera, Mar 31, 2017)
 Afghans risked their lives for U.S., now struggle in Sacramento (video) 

Deportation from the United States
American people of Afghan descent
Afghan-American culture
Afghanistan–United States relations
Asian-American issues